Stokesby with Herringby is a civil parish in the English county of Norfolk. It comprises the village of Stokesby and the surrounding rural area. It is situated on the banks of the River Bure, some 10 km west of the town of Great Yarmouth and 25 km east of the city of Norwich.

The civil parish has an area of 8.61 km² and in the 2001 census had a population of 293 in 116 households, the population increasing to 330 at the 2011 census. For the purposes of local government, the parish falls within the district of Great Yarmouth.

Notes

External links

Information from Genuki Norfolk on Stokesby
Stokesby web site

Civil parishes in Norfolk
Borough of Great Yarmouth